The Dr. Charles Compton House is a historic house located at 1303 South Wiggins Avenue in the Oak Knolls neighborhood of Springfield, Illinois. The house was built in 1926 for Dr. Charles Wentworth Compton, a local surgeon and the founder of local political group the Wentworth Republicans. Springfield architects Helmle and Helmle designed the Tudor Revival house, which was one of their many works in Oak Knolls. The house's front facade features a variety of materials and textures. The main entrance has its own roof and neighbors a stone tower with a parapet. The front of the house has a projecting gable on either side of the door; one gable is stucco with brick-edged windows, while the other matches the rest of the front facade, with brick on the first floor and stucco half-timbering on the second. The original slate roof of the house is broken by two brick chimneys.

The house was added to the National Register of Historic Places on May 8, 2017.

References

National Register of Historic Places in Sangamon County, Illinois
Houses on the National Register of Historic Places in Illinois
Houses in Springfield, Illinois
Tudor Revival architecture in Illinois
Houses completed in 1926